Chanayut Jejue (born 2 February 1999) is a Thai professional footballer who plays as a midfielder.

References

External links

1999 births
Living people
Chanayut Jejue
Chanayut Jejue
Association football midfielders
Chanayut Jejue
Chanayut Jejue
Chanayut Jejue
Chanayut Jejue
Chanayut Jejue
Chanayut Jejue
Chanayut Jejue
Chanayut Jejue